Daniel Dean Pembroke  (born 16 July 1991) is a British athlete who specialises in the Javelin throw.

As a junior athlete, he competed for Great Britain and Northern Ireland in three age-group championships. His highest placing was 11th in the javelin at the 2011 IAAF World U20 Championships in Moncton, Canada.
An elbow injury ended his chances of qualifying for the Olympic Games in 2012, so he took a break from the sport until 2019.

He was diagnosed with RP (Retinitis pigmentosa) when he was six and his eyesight became further impaired during his twenties.

In 2021 he accepted a place on the British Paralympic World Class Programme (WCP).
He went on to win Gold in the T13 javelin throw at the 2020 Summer Paralympics in Tokyo (held in 2021). In doing so he threw a new Paralympic record of 69.52 meters with his third attempt.

Pembroke was appointed Member of the Order of the British Empire (MBE) in the 2022 New Year Honours for services to athletics.

References

1991 births#
Living people
British male javelin throwers
British disabled sportspeople
Paralympic athletes with a vision impairment
Paralympic gold medalists for Great Britain
Athletes (track and field) at the 2020 Summer Paralympics
Medalists at the 2020 Summer Paralympics
Paralympic medalists in athletics (track and field)
Paralympic athletes of Great Britain
Members of the Order of the British Empire
1991 births
British blind people